Anthony Miller (October 22, 1971) is an American former professional basketball player who played parts of eight seasons in the National Basketball Association (NBA). He was selected by the Golden State Warriors in the second round (39th pick overall) of the 1994 NBA draft. He was born and raised in Benton Harbor, Michigan.

A  forward from Michigan State University, Miller played in eight NBA seasons for the Los Angeles Lakers, Atlanta Hawks, Houston Rockets and Philadelphia 76ers. He has also been under contract with the Minnesota Timberwolves and Golden State Warriors. The last time Miller played in the NBA was during the 2004-05 season, appearing in 2 games for the Hawks.

In his NBA career, Miller played in 181 games and scored a total of 510 points.

Miller played in the CBA for the Yakima Sun Kings but signed with the American Basketball Association's Las Vegas Aces on August 27, 2008.

Miller appeared in the 1996 movie Space Jam along with Laker teammates Cedric Ceballos and Vlade Divac and then-coach Del Harris.

External links
Basketballreference.com page

1971 births
Living people
20th-century African-American sportspeople
21st-century African-American sportspeople
African-American basketball players
American men's basketball players
Atlanta Hawks players
ABA All-Star Game players
Basketball players from Michigan
CBA All-Star Game players
Florida Beachdogs players
Golden State Warriors draft picks
Harlem Globetrotters players
Houston Rockets players
Los Angeles Lakers players
Michigan State Spartans men's basketball players
People from Benton Harbor, Michigan
Philadelphia 76ers players
Power forwards (basketball)
Yakima Sun Kings players